The Old West is a series of books about the history of the American Old West era, published by Time-Life Books from 1973 through 1980. Each book focused on a different topic specific for the era, such as cowboys, American Indians, gamblers and gunfighters.

Overview
Each volume in the series is 240 pages long, featuring many contemporary pictures and illustrations.  They are bound in a padded imitation leather hardcover binding with the series name, title of the book, and publisher imprinted in gold on the spine of the book. The front cover of the book has a glued-on oval shaped picture. Beneath the picture embossed in the faux leather is a set of cattle horns with a rising sun depicted between the horns. The outline of the cover is embossed with a rustic rope. The back cover is blank. The series was issued without a dust jacket. There are 27 volumes in the series, of which volume 27, the "Master Index", was executed as a stapled 65-page soft cover release, not featuring any illustrations:

Slipcase
When the series was launched the publisher tried to entice customers to take out a subscription by offering a promotional in gold imprinted hardboard slipcase which held the volumes The Ranchers, The Gunfighters and The Trailblazers. This slipcase is relatively rare, as it was not offered up for regular sale by the company

Excerpt
A 432-page abridged excerpt hardcover variant edition with dust jacket, its chapter organization roughly following the series topics, was a decade later published in October 1990 by educational publisher Prentice Hall as "The Old West". Though licensed to Prentice Hall, the book sported the Time Life logo on its spine. Renowned Old West historian Robert M. Utley (who had not contributed to the main series) provided the foreword for the excerpt edition.

Reprints
Despite the circumstance that the golden age of the Western had already ended in the USA by the time the series was launched, it managed to become one of the more popular Time Life book series, exemplified by the fact that the series remained in print for the better part of two decades. However, it was not the series as a whole that enjoyed reprint runs, but rather the individual volumes which were reprinted according to need as some titles were more appealing to the public than the others. For example, of the most popular title, volume 8 – The Gunfighters – , is known that it enjoyed at least ten printings, the last one in 2004. Of volume 15 – The Chroniclers – on the other hand, are only three printings known, the original printing, followed by reprints 1979 and 1981. It is, together with the Master Index, the least reprinted volume of the series, all the others having enjoyed at the very least four printings.

Until the mid-1980s, reprints were reissued in the exact same format as the original printing. Afterwards though, a couple of the more popular volumes requiring reprints (usually after their 5th-7th printing), were executed differently as more traditional hardcover editions, endowed with new cover art and where the 1997/1999 reprints are concerned with dust jackets, but all of them dispensing with the padded faux leather cover. Since only a handful of titles were reissued as such, they were hardly recognizable as series volumes, and could easily be considered/confused as stand-alone editions, especially because each of them were released irregularly. Additionally, these latter-day reprints were issued in comparatively small numbers, making them quite rare in comparison to the ubiquitous faux leather editions. Furthermore, many reprints were issued with new ISBNs, especially when it concerned a revised edition.
	
The following titles are known to have seen latter-day reprints in a deviant book format,
The Gunfighters (1986, 1999)
The Gamblers (1997)
The Cowboys (1999)

The prolific reprint runs has made the series one of the more easily obtainable Time Life book series in the after-sale, or second-hand markets, the faux leather bound editions in particular.

International editions
Four of the more popular titles saw separate latter-day British reprint versions in the UK as a standard (non-padded) hardcover in a dust jacket book format, even though British customers could originally coach along with their US counterparts by ordering the US version of the series through their nearest Time Life Books subsidiary. The four British reprint editions of 2004/06 were published by the short-lived local "Time Life UK"  London branch, the successor of the European "Time-Life International BV" Amsterdam branch, which went defunct after mother company "Time Life Books" was closed down in 2001 as a dedicated book publishing division.
	
As an American-specific topic, this series was not widely translated into other languages, but two identically executed foreign-language editions were released by the "Time-Life International BV" Amsterdam branch nonetheless; the 1978-1980 German-language Der Wilde Westen edition, which was shy of six volumes (seven when counting the "Master Index"), and the 1978-1981 French-language Le Far West edition, equally shy of six (or seven) volumes. That the series was partially translated into these two languages was not only due to the historical ties France and Germany had with the era in question, but also because the Western genre has never gone out of vogue in both countries, particularly in Germany where the popularity of the genre has since the days of Karl May remained unabated, unlike in native US. As with the American edition, several of the more popular volumes saw multiple reprint runs in West-Germany. Of the most popular one, volume 8 called "Die Revolverhelden" (="The Gunfighters"), is known that it has seen at least six German-language printings.

Aside from these editions released by Time Life themselves, there were at least three additional, but far more obscure licensed international series editions known, all of them truncated; the oldest of these concerned the 1974-1975 Yugoslavian Resnična zgodovina Divjega zahoda ("The true history of the Wild West"), which was licensed to Slovenian publisher Cankarjeva Založba. Being the most obscure of the three, the extent of this slightly differently executed hardcover edition is therefore not known. Like in France and Germany, the Western had been a popular genre in Yugoslavia, before the outbreak of the wars that spelt the end of that nation. A ten-volume Japanese-language Daiseibu monogatari ("Large Western Story") edition is known to have been released by Tokyo-based publisher Taimuraihubukkusu in 1976, identical in exterior to the American source publications, but with Japanese-language interior texts. The third edition concerned the Swedish-language ten-volume Wild West release, published in 1984-85 by Swedish publisher Bokorama and likewise greatly resembling the American source publication. As if to underscore the appeal of these two titles, "The Gunfighters" and "The Cowboys" are the only two volumes that saw printings in all six known international editions.

As in the UK, other language territory customers were offered the opportunity to acquire the original American version via mail through their nearest Time Life Books subsidiary, typically by series subscription.

Spin-offs
The success of the series has enticed Time-Life to delve somewhat deeper into the subject of the Old West with follow-up releases as companion series. The first of these concerned, Classics of the Old West (1980-1984, 31 volumes), deluxe reproductions of memoirs written by Old West contemporaries and eye witnesses, which was started right upon the conclusion of the main series. Most of these works had actually already been used as primary reference sources for quotation/citation purposes in the main series. To further reinforce the connection between the two series, it was decided to execute the Classics in the same vein as the main series as faux leather bound volumes with embossed Old West symbology on the padded hardcover, without an cover illustration, but with gold-coated paper edges to emphasize the deluxe visual appeal of the series. Time Life has repeated this formula trice more shortly afterwards, for their The Epic of Flight, The Civil War, and Mysteries of the Unknown series.
	
The second series was less heavy handed on the connections with the main series and concerned The American Indians (1992–96, 23 volumes, re-titled to The Native Americans for reprinted volumes). The role of the Native Americans in the history of the Old West could not be covered as in-depth in the main series as their huge part in it warranted, due to the broad scope of the subject matter. The Time Life editors apparently felt likewise and decided to dedicate a separate series to the Native Americans, which not only covered their place in American history, but also paid ample attention to their culture. There was however one clear-cut connection; one volume, "Native Americans of the Old West" (1995), was actually a reprint of volume 2 of the main series, "The Indians" (essentially constituting its 7th printing), and was the only volume in the series to run for 240 pages instead of the standard 176 pages for the rest of the series, aside from lacking an ISBN as well.
	
Additionally, and beyond the aforementioned 1990 excerpt edition release, Time Life has released three further single titles dealing with the subject matter. Titles thus released concerned,
 "The Wild West" (March 1993, 368 pages); companion hardcover with dust jacket book to the hereafter mentioned television series and featuring a foreword by Old West historian Dee Brown; a deluxe embossed faux leather bound edition was also released prior to the retail version.
 "Settling the West" (December 1996, 192 pages); hardcover with dust jacket, part of the six-volume mini-series The American Story, that dealt with selected highlights of US history
 "The Wild West: True Tales And Amazing Legends" (August 2017, 96 pages); softcover magazine-style release
	
Apart from the book titles, Time-Life has under its own "Time Life Video" imprint co-released in 1994 the aforementioned 1993 documentary television mini-series The Wild West from Rattlesnake Productions. as a 10-tape VHS set, featuring two episodes per tape. Warner Home Video was the co-producer of the VHS set.

Promotion
As had become standard practice for Time Life Books by the late 1970s and 1980s, the series was vigorously supported by a television ad campaign in the form of a series of commercials transmitted either in first-run syndication or during late-night television programming. Being considered the one that was most appealing to the imagination, it was "The Gunfighters" that was chosen by the publisher as the series show piece, featuring prominently in several contemporary television commercials, one of them presented by actor Jack Palance (known for his roles as Western "bad guy", most famously in Shane). This title was also selected as the premier title to be sent out to customers who were enticed to take out a series subscription.

The television ad campaigns were complementary to Time Life's standard practice of sending out elaborate multi-sheet mailings to their already existing customer base, in which a series was introduced in detail to a potential subscriber; having taken out a subscription once, a customer was then registered in Time Life Books' customer database, the company's crucial business model marketing tool.

See also
The West As America Art Exhibition

References

Series of non-fiction books
Non-fiction books about outlaws of the American Old West
Time Life book series